Messia Garabedian (Armenian: Մեսիա Կարապետյան), is an Armenian singer and musician based in Amsterdam.

Early years and career 
Messia Garabedian was born in Baghdad, Iraq on August 31, 1993. He is originally from Armenia. His home country is the reason behind his beautiful songwriting as Messia is widely famous for his traditional Armenian wedding songs. He has released two music albums so far and has performed in Armenia, Belgium, Brazil, Canada, France, Germany, Greece, Jordan, Luxemburg, and the Netherlands. Music critics have stated that “he is something different” as he has managed to achieve what seems to be rather impossible, and that is combining a purely traditional genre with more subtle modern elements, which is exactly what makes Messia a very current artist. He is also one of the most famous pianists of the Armenian community in the Netherlands.

Personal life 
He recently married his wife, Hasmik Gabrieljan, a Russian Armenian lady. His uncle, Christopher Garabedian, is also a great musician, known for his blend of western and oriental melodies, as well as traditional Iraqi songs.

References

External links 
 Messia Garabedian Official Website
 MessiaGarabedianOfficial on YouTube

Living people
1993 births
Armenian pop singers
21st-century Armenian male singers
People from Baghdad
Iraqi people of Armenian descent